Ziddi (1973) is a Pakistani film in the Punjabi language, released on January 16, 1973. The cast included Yousuf Khan, Nabeela and Firdous. It is considered a hit movie of 1973 that won 6 Nigar Awards.

Cast 
Yousuf Khan
Firdous
Ejaz
Zumurrad
Munawar Zarif as Shaadi
Nannha
Khalifa Nazir
Naeem Hashmi
Hamid Hussain
Rozina
 Mumtaz
Nabila
Ilyas Kashmiri
Rangeela
Changezi
Tani Begum

Super-hit songs of this film
 "Teray Naal Naal Wey Mein Rehna" sung by Noor Jehan
 "Sohnia Mein Teray Jee Sadaqay, Hore Mein Aakhaan Kee Sadaqay" sung by Noor Jehan
 "Wey Chhadd Meri Weeni Na Marore" sung by Noor Jehan
 "Akhhian Wey Raateen Saun Na Deindian" sung by Noor Jehan

The songs' lyrics were written by Saifuddin Saif, Hazeen Qadri and Waris Ludhianvi, and music was composed by Master Abdullah.

Awards
Won 6 Nigar Awards for Best Film, Best Director, Best Script, Best Actor, Best Actress and Best Music in the Punjabi language films category.

References

External links 
 

1973 films
Pakistani action films
Pakistani crime films
Pakistani fantasy films
Punjabi-language Pakistani films
1973 directorial debut films
Nigar Award winners
1970s Punjabi-language films